Chartley may refer to:

Places
Chartley Castle lies in ruins to the north of the village of Stowe-by-Chartley in Staffordshire
Chartley Moss, a biological Site of Special Scientific Interest in Staffordshire
Chartley railway station, former British railway station to serve the village of Stowe-by-Chartley in Staffordshire
Stowe-by-Chartley, a village and civil parish in Staffordshire
Chartley, Massachusetts, a village in the town of Norton

Barons
Baron Ferrers of Chartley, created on February 6, 1299 for John de Ferrers, 1st Baron Ferrers of Chartley
John de Ferrers, 1st Baron Ferrers of Chartley (1271–1312)
Robert de Ferrers, 3rd Baron Ferrers of Chartley (1309–1350)
John de Ferrers, 4th Baron Ferrers of Chartley (1331–1367)
Robert de Ferrers, 5th Baron Ferrers of Chartley (1358–1413)
Edmund de Ferrers, 6th Baron Ferrers of Chartley (1386–1435)
Walter Devereux, 8th Baron Ferrers of Chartley (1431–1485)
John Devereux, 9th Baron Ferrers of Chartley (1463–1501)